"The King Is Dead" is a song written and originally recorded by Australian singer and songwriter Tony Cole. Produced by David McKay, it was part of Tony Cole's debut album If The Music Stops (1972). That year the song was also released as a single, with "Ruby" on the flip side.

Background and commercial performance 
"The King Is Dead" was the second single released from Tony Cole's debut album If The Music Stops (1972). U.S. Billboard magazine picked the single for its "Radio Action and Pick Singles" section. The review was:

Nevertheless, the song didn't chart either on U.S. Billboard's charts, or on the UK Singles Chart.

Track listings 
7" single 20th Century Records (1972, United States)
A. "The King Is Dead" (2:52)
B. "Ruby" (2:32)

7" single Jare International 410 067 EA (1977, France)
A. "The King Is Dead"
B. "Natural Dance"

Johnny Hallyday version (in French) 

Several years later the song was adapted into French (under the title "Gabrielle") by Long Chris and Patrick Larue and recorded by Johnny Hallyday. His version was released as a single in 1976 and spent three consecutive weeks on the singles sales chart in France (from 16 September to 6 October).

Charts

References 

1972 songs
1972 singles
1976 singles
Songs written by Tony Cole (musician)
20th Century Fox Records singles
Johnny Hallyday songs
French songs
Mercury Records singles
Number-one singles in France